The parore (Girella tricuspidata) also known as luderick, black bream or blackfish is a species of marine ray-finned fish, a sea chub from the family Kyphosidae which is found in the southwestern Pacific Ocean off Australia and New Zealand. Parore or paraore is the common name in New Zealand but in Australia luderick is preferred.

Description
The parore has a moderately deep, compressed, oval shaped body with a thin caudal peduncle, It has a small head which has a slightly convex forehead, and small eyes. The mouth is small and does not extend as far as the eye. The jaws have an outer row of overlapping, flattened, tricuspid teeth beside a wide band of teeth of similar shape but which are tiny. Much of the body is covered im moderately small ctenoid scales and there is an arched lateral line, made up of 48-51 pored scales, which is parallel to the dorsal profile. It has a continuous dorsal fin which has no demarcation between its spiny and rayed parts. The spiny part has 14-16 spines and is one and a half times to almost twice as long as the soft rayed part which contains 11-12 soft rays. The anal fin is similar to the soft-rayed part of the dorsal fin, contains 3 spines and 11-12 soft rays and is situated opposite it. The caudal fin has 17 rays, is very large and  broadly forked. The pectoral fins are small, with 16 rays the uppermost being the longest, and the pelvic fins are small, containing a spine and 5 rays. The colour and pattern of the parore is dark greenish-grey dorsally and silvery grey on the flanks and ventrally and belly. There are around 11 thin dark vertical bars underneath the dorsal finwhich fade ventrally. The head and pectoral fins are sometimes yellowish in colour but the fins are usually the same colour as the part of the body they are nearest to.

Distribution
The parore occurs off eastern Australia and New Zealand. In Australia it occurs from Mackay, Queensland, to east of Adelaide in South Australia and off most of Tasmania. In New Zealand it occurs on both the east and west coasts of the North Island from the North Cape to the Cook Strait.

Habitat and biology
Parore are found in shallow coastal and estuarine waters where the frequently congregate in large schools in the vicinity of rocky outcrops and jetties. The small juveniles use seagrass beds to hide from predators. This species is an omnivore which use their small sharp, incisor-like teeth for grazing on seaweed, especially  the filamentous green algae Enteromorpha intestinalis and sea cabbage. They also a band of crushing teeth which are used to grind algae. Analysis of their stomach contents have shown that parore opportunistically feed on other food items like small crustaceans, pipi, mussels and worms. As parore mature, they congregate in large shoals and the adults form 'runs' from estuarine waters and coastal lakes into the sea. The fish spawn in the surf zone and mouths of estuaries, spawning takes place in the winter.

Fisheries

Parore are fished for commercially in New South Wales and in New Zealand they are landed as a bycatch in the grey mullet fishery. The fish are sold fresh. They are a popular quarry for recreational fisheries in Australia and can be caught of seaweed under a float or artificial wee fly, less so in New Zealand where they appear to be mainly caught by recreational fishermen targeting other species.

Species description
The parore was first formally described as Boops tricuspidatus in 1824 by Jean René Constant Quoy & Joseph Paul Gaimard with the type locality given as "Shark Bay, Western Australia".

References
 
 Tony Ayling & Geoffrey Cox, Collins Guide to the Sea Fishes of New Zealand,  (William Collins Publishers Ltd, Auckland, New Zealand 1982) 

Girella
Marine fish of Eastern Australia
Marine fish of New Zealand
Fish described in 1824